The Health Act 2006 (c 28) is an Act of the Parliament of the United Kingdom. It provides for a number of administrative changes in the National Health Service.

Part 1 - Smoking

Chapter 1 - Smoke-free premises, places and vehicles

The Act is best known for having introduced provisions for the creation of a ban on smoking in enclosed public places. This ban focuses on smoking:

 In places of work.
 In places that the public access to obtain goods and services, including private clubs.
 In other places designated by Statutory Instrument.

The sections of the Act allowing a ban extend to England and Wales although the provisions implementing the ban came into effect separately in England and Wales. In England the ban took effect on 1 July 2007. The ban in Wales came into effect on 2 April 2007.

Smoking was banned separately in Northern Ireland and Scotland — in Northern Ireland by the Smoking (Northern Ireland) Order 2006 which took effect on 30 April 2007, and in Scotland (taking effect 26 March 2006) by the Smoking, Health and Social Care (Scotland) Act 2005.

In 2017, the Supreme Court held that the smoking ban contained in chapter 1 of the Act did not bind the Crown, and therefore did not need to be enforced on Crown premises such as prisons.

Chapter 2 - Age of sale for tobacco etc
Section 13 granted the Secretary of State the power to increase the age for purchasing tobacco from 16 to 18, which came into force on 1 October 2007.

Part 7 - Final provisions

Section 83 - Commencement
The following orders have been made under this section:
The Health Act 2006 (Commencement No. 1 and Transitional Provisions) Order 2006 (S.I. 2006/2603 (C.88))
The Health Act 2006 (Commencement No. 2) Order 2006 (S.I. 2006/3125 (C.108))
The Health Act 2006 (Commencement No. 3) Order 2007 (S.I. 2007/1375 (C.57))
The Health Act 2006 (Commencement No. 4) Order 2008 (S.I. 2008/1147 (C.50))
The Health Act 2006 (Commencement No. 5) Order 2008 (S.I. 2008/1972 (C.96))
The Health Act 2006 (Commencement No. 6) Order 2008 (S.I. 2008/2714 (C.119))
The Health Act 2006 (Commencement No. 1 and Transitional Provisions) (Wales) Order 2007 (S.I. 2007/204 (W.18) (C.9))
The Health Act 2006 (Commencement No. 2) (Wales) Order 2008 (S.I. 2008/3171 (W.284))
The Health Act 2006 (Commencement No. 1) (Scotland) Order 2007 (S.S.I. 2007/9 (C.1))

See also
 Smoking in the United Kingdom

References
Halsbury's Statutes,

External links
The Health Act 2006, as amended from the National Archives.
The Health Act 2006, as originally enacted from the National Archives.
Explanatory notes to the Health Act 2006.

United Kingdom Acts of Parliament 2006
NHS legislation
Tobacco control
Smoking in the United Kingdom